The Suusamyr-Kökömeren hydropower cascade is a future hydropower project in Naryn Region, Kyrgyzstan. When completed, it will consist of 3 hydropower plants on the river Kökömeren and its tributary Batysh Karakol: Karakol, Kökömeren-1 and Kökömeren-2, with a total installed capacity of 1305 MW.

References

Hydroelectric power stations in Kyrgyzstan
Proposed hydroelectric power stations
Proposed renewable energy power stations in Kyrgyzstan